Mahon is an unincorporated community in Jackson Township, Huntington County, Indiana.

History
Mahon was laid out and platted in 1853, not long after the Wabash and Erie Canal was extended to that point. It was named for its founder, Archibald Mahon.

A post office was established at Mahon in 1853, and remained in operation until it was discontinued in 1867.

Geography

References

Unincorporated communities in Huntington County, Indiana
Unincorporated communities in Indiana